Better Than This may refer to:
 Better Than This (album), a 1998 album by The Normals
 Better Than This (song), a 2020 song by Paloma Faith
 "Better Than This", a 2009 song by Keane from their album Perfect Symmetry